Nolia Clap is the only extended play by American hip hop group UTP. It was released on November 23, 2004 through Rap-A-Lot Records. Recording sessions took place at Dean's List House Hits in Houston, at Stone House in Los Angeles, at Studio Center in Miami, and at UTP Studios in New Orleans. Production was handled by Derek "Grizz" Edwards, Donald "XL" Robertson, Mike Dean, Slice Tee and Juvenile. It features guest appearances from Kango, Bun B, Earl Hayes, Hot Wright, Red Eye, Slim Thug, T.I. and Z-Ro.

After the success of UTP's single "Nolia Clap", Rap-A-Lot released a seven-track EP to capitalize on the single's success. It contained both the original version on "Nolia Clap", a new remix of the song, and a few unreleased tracks that did not make the cut for The Beginning of the End.... The EP did not fare as well as the single however, and only reached number 65 on the Billboard Top R&B/Hip-Hop Albums.

Track listing

Personnel 
Terius "Juvenile" Gray – main artist, producer (tracks: 1, 2, 5, 7), mixing, executive producer, A&R
Damon "Wacko" Grison – main artist
Clifford "Skip" Nicholas – main artist
Walter "Kango" Williams – featured artist (tracks: 1, 2, 5)
Red Eye – featured artist (track 3)
Joseph "Z-Ro" McVey – featured artist (track 13)
Bernard "Bun B" Freeman – featured artist (track 14)
Earl Hayes – featured artist (track 14)
Stayve "Slim Thug" Thomas – featured artist (track 14)
Clifford "T.I." Harris – featured artist (track 14)
Hot Wright – featured artist (track 14)
Michael Dean – producer (tracks: 1, 3), mixing, mastering
Sheldon "Slice Tee" Arrington – producer (tracks: 2, 5)
Derek "Grizz" Edwards – producer (tracks: 3, 6)
Donald "XL" Robertson – producer (tracks: 4, 7)
James Prince – executive producer
Dave Junco – engineering, mixing
John "JP" Pegram – engineering
Anzel "Int'l Red" Jennings – A&R
Tony "Big Chief" Randle – A&R supervisor
Paul Francis – project administrator
Mark Hayes – art direction, design
Tom Phillips – photography

Charts

References

External links

2004 debut EPs
UTP (group) albums
Rap-A-Lot Records albums
Albums produced by Mike Dean (record producer)